Mohanty/Mahanty/Mahanti is a native Odia surname native to Odisha but is also used in neighbouring states of Odisha such as Andhra Pradesh, Chhattisgarh, Telangana migration.

Notable Person:-

Akshaya Mohanty (1937–2002), a music personality from Odisha, India
Anubhav Mohanty, a movie star from Odisha, India
Babushaan Mohanty, an Ollywood star
Bijay Mohanty (1950–2020), an Indian actor
Byomakesh Mohanty (1957–2010), an Indian artist and academic
Chandi Prasad Mohanty, Vice chief of Army staff
Chandra Talpade Mohanty (born 1955), a postcolonial and transnational feminist theorist
Debashish Mohanty (born 1976), an Indian cricketer
Deepak Mohanty, the executive director at the head office of RBI, Mumbai
Durga Charan Mohanty (1912–1985), a dharmic writer
Gopinath Mohanty (1914–1991), a novelist
Indrajit Mahanty, Chief Justice of Rajasthan high court
Jagadish Mohanty (born 1951), a fiction writer
Jitendra Nath Mohanty, a professor emeritus at Temple University
Leena Mohanty , (Born 1972) leading exponent of Odissi dance.
Rituraj Mohanty, the winner of 2014 edition of India's Raw Star
Sanghamitra Mohanty (1953–2021), Indian computer scientist
Saraju Mohanty, professor at the University of North Texas (UNT) in Denton, Texas
Surendra Mohanty (1922–1990), Odia writer and Politician
Uttam Mohanty, an Ollywood star

Hindu surnames
Surnames
 
Indian surnames